Azenaide Danila José Carlos a.k.a. Zizica (born 14 June 1990) is an Angolan handball player for Rapid București and the Angolan handball team.

She participated at the 2011 World Women's Handball Championship in Brazil, and the 2008, 2012, 2016, and 2020 Olympics.

Azenaide had spent her entire career at Angolan side Primeiro de Agosto. In January 2014, she moved to arch-rival Petro Atlético.

References

External links

1990 births
Living people
Angolan female handball players
Olympic handball players of Angola
Handball players at the 2016 Summer Olympics
Handball players at the 2012 Summer Olympics
Handball players at the 2008 Summer Olympics
Handball players from Luanda
Expatriate handball players
Angolan expatriate sportspeople in Croatia
Angolan expatriate sportspeople in Spain
African Games gold medalists for Angola
African Games medalists in handball
Competitors at the 2011 All-Africa Games
Competitors at the 2015 African Games
RK Podravka Koprivnica players
Handball players at the 2020 Summer Olympics